Hesperolabops is a genus of plant bugs in the family Miridae. There are about nine described species in Hesperolabops.

Species
These nine species belong to the genus Hesperolabops:
 Hesperolabops cereus Schaffner & Carvalho, 1981
 Hesperolabops gelastops Kirkaldy, 1902 (cactus bug)
 Hesperolabops mexica Froeschner, 1967
 Hesperolabops murrayi Schaffner & Carvalho, 1981
 Hesperolabops nigriceps Reuter, 1908
 Hesperolabops periscopis Knight, 1928
 Hesperolabops sanguineus Reuter, 1908
 Hesperolabops spinosus Carvalho, 1984
 Hesperolabops zapotitlanensis Schaffner & Carvalho, 1981

References

Further reading

 
 
 

Miridae genera
Articles created by Qbugbot
Eccritotarsini